Heritage Hill State Historical Park, is a 56-acre open-air museum located in Allouez, Wisconsin near Green Bay, Wisconsin, in the United States. A Wisconsin state park, the site is operated by a non-profit organization called the Heritage Hill Corporation in partnership with the Wisconsin Department of Natural Resources (DNR). The Heritage Hill Corporation operates, maintains and develops the park under terms of a lease with the DNR.

The site contains 26 historical and reproduction structures, mostly endangered historic buildings moved from other locations plus a few modern reconstructions. The Park is divided into four main areas: The Fur Trade, representing the first contact and fur trade industry in Wisconsin; The Growing Community, representing Green Bay's beginnings as a burgeoning metropolis in the late 19th century; The Belgian Farmstead, a representation of immigrant farming communities in the early 20th century; and Fort Howard, a reconstruction of how Fort Howard would have stood on the west side of Green Bay in the mid-19th century. 

The Park is open year round with the majority of programming from May - September, including costumed guides, called "interpreters," in the historic and reproduction buildings.

History
Previously the property was used as a prison farm with orchards tended by prison labor.  Construction of highway 172 across the Fox River cut off the farm from the prison and the land fell under the jurisdiction of the Wisconsin Department of Natural Resources.  In 1972 the DNR Natural Resources Board approved the establishment of a historical park.  In a meeting held at Cotton House on July 18, 1972, the name Heritage Hill State Historical Park was chosen for the new historic site.  At the same time a proposed development plan and an opening date of May 1, 1977 was selected. Over the next 20 years more than 25 buildings and 15 acres of land were added to the park. Preservation of the buildings and its artifacts and the interpretation of the history of Northeastern Wisconsin and its people remains a primary objective.

Collections
Heritage Hill has more than 9,000 artifacts in its collection, mostly displayed in the buildings. Some of this collection is on loan from the Green Bay-De Pere Antiquarians, Brown County Historical Society, and Wisconsin Historical Society. The collection includes original artwork, books, clothing and furnishings dating from the 17th century to present. One unique piece displayed in the Tank Cottage is a hand-painted screen that the Tank family brought with them when they moved to Wisconsin in the late 1600s.

Education Center
In 2006 the Betsy Hendrickson and Lucyanna Hitch Education Center was constructed. The center allows year-round use for education programs as well as business meetings, receptions, and parties. Education programs draw about 18,000 students per year. Students acquire a first hand look at how their early relatives worked and played. The programs meet benchmarks and standards in history and social studies.

List of structures

Six of the site's structures are listed on the National Register of Historic Places. The park's Belgian Farmstead and Moravian church were listed on the National Register but were delisted upon being relocated.  Seven other buildings in the park collection are modern replicas constructed on-site.

See also 
National Register of Historic Places listings in Brown County, Wisconsin
List of the oldest buildings in Wisconsin

References

Notes

External links

Heritage Hill State Historical Park official site

1972 establishments in Wisconsin
Buildings and structures in Green Bay, Wisconsin
Museums in Brown County, Wisconsin
Open-air museums in Wisconsin
Protected areas established in 1972
Protected areas of Brown County, Wisconsin
State parks of Wisconsin